Type 352 Ensdorf class minesweepers are a class of five minesweepers of the German Navy. They are Type 343 s that have been upgraded with the Troika Plus system of minesweeping drones

Design
The Ensdorf class have three modes to clear mine fields:

 Troika Plus: This system employs up to four remote controlled Seehund ("seal") drones which perform the sweep. The drones are small unmanned boats that can simulate the acoustic and magnetic signatures of bigger ships to trigger mines. Their small size and special construction let them survive the effects of exploding mines unharmed.
 Mine hunting: Mines detected with the hull-mounted sonar can be identified and exploded with expendable Seefuchs (Seafox) ROVs.
 Classical minesweeping: Against moored mines the classical minesweeping using towed wire cutters to cut the anchors of mines can be conducted.

The Ensdorf class replaced the Type 351 s in service with the German Navy.

Seehund 

The Seehund unmanned surface vehicles can be controlled remotely or manually by an onboard crew (usually three) for maneuvering in harbours or in training (the Seehund is too large to be carried by Ensdorf-class vessels). A life raft is carried for this reason.

Ship list

Notes: The ships were not decommissioned for their rebuilding to Type 352, so the listed dates are the ones of their commission as Type 343. Auerbach/Oberpfalz is one single name.

The ships currently belong to the 5. Minensuchgeschwader (5th Mine Sweeping Squadron) based in Kiel at the Baltic Sea.

ROVs

The Seehunde ROVs were taken from the six decommissioned Type 351 class, which means that they are older than their motherships.

References

Mine warfare vessel classes
Minesweepers of the German Navy